Cortestina is a genus of spiders in the family Oonopidae. It was first described in 2009 by Knoflach. , it contains only one species, Cortestina thaleri, found in Austria and Italy.

References

Oonopidae
Monotypic Araneomorphae genera